Lampronia psychidella is a moth of the family Prodoxidae. It is found in France.

References

Moths described in 1854
Prodoxidae
Moths of Europe